Sandro Magister (born 2 October 1943) is an Italian journalist who writes for the magazine L'espresso.

Magister specializes in religious news, in particular on the Catholic Church and the Vatican. He has written two books on the political history of the Italian episcopate: "Italian Church: Vatican Politics and Italy 1943-1978" and "Extraparliamentary Church: The Triumph of the Pulpit". He also manages the website Chiesa on the topic of modern ecclesiastical affairs.

Some days before its official publication on June 18, 2015, Sandro Magister was accused of violating an embargo by publishing parts of the encyclical Laudato si, and was deprived of accreditation to the Vatican press room as a result, on June 16, 2015. Magister's response was that the document was an early draft not covered by the embargo, obtained by his editor who made the decision to publish; he had written merely an introduction.

He, his wife Anna, and their two daughters live in Rome.

References

External links
 Biography
 Magister's blog (English version)

1943 births
Living people
Università Cattolica del Sacro Cuore alumni
People from Busto Arsizio
Italian journalists
Italian male journalists
Religion journalists